Idioteuthis okutanii is a species of whip-lash squid. Richard E. Young and Michael Vecchione consider I. okutanii to be a junior synonym of I. hjorti.

References
Salcedo-Vargas, M.A. 1997. Cephalopods from the Netherlands Indian Ocean Programme (NIOP) - II. Mastigoteuthid lineage and related forms. Beaufortia 47: 91-108.

External links

Tree of Life web project: Idioteuthis okutanii

Whip-lash squid